Ashish R. Shukla is an Indian film director and writer. He is best known for his films and like Prague and Bahut Hua Sammaan.

Early life 
Shukla was born in Mumbai and raised in the neighbourhood of Vakola, Santacruz. Ashish worked for various ad agencies for 6 years as creative director.

Career 
Shukla started his journey as an assistant director to Prahlad Kakkar. He worked as creative director with Anurag Kashyap in the film Dev D.

He directed short films like The Lock and Nawazuddin Siddiqui starrer The Journey.

Shukla made his directing and writing debut with Prague. In 2020, he directed  the film Bahut Hua Sammaan starring Raghav Juyal, Sanjay Mishra, Ram Kapoor and Nidhi Singh. In the same year, he directed web series Undekhi produced by Applause Entertainment & Edgestorm Ventures. In 2021, he directed web series Candy.

Filmography 
Bahut Hua Sammaan
Prague

Web series 
Candy
Undekhi

References 

Indian film directors
Indian writers
Living people
Year of birth missing (living people)